Ma Hong (May 18, 1920 ? – October 28, 2007), born in Dingxiang County, Shanxi Province, China, was a well known economist and was chiefly responsible for the reintroduction of market economics to China. He also pioneered Policy Consultation and chaired a government think tank.

Early life
Ma Hong took part in Ximenghui in 1936, an organization of resistance against the Japanese. The following year he was involved in the organization of the General Trade Union of Tongpu Railroad, and in that same year joined the Communist Party of China. In 1938 he went to Yan'an, then the Communist capital, and won Chen Yun's (Minister of Organization) favour. As a result, he was admitted into the CPC's Central School. After graduation in 1941 Ma Hong was assigned to be a researcher in the CPC's Central Research Institute, laying the foundations of his later economic knowledge. He was transferred the CPC's Northeast Bureau to be the director of the Policy Research Office in 1949. Through investigation Ma Hong wrote "The Structure and Policy of the Northeastern Economy", and divided it into five sectors. This method was long employed by the Chinese Government. In 1952 Ma Hong was promoted to the post of General Secretary of the National Planning Committee of the Central Government.

During the Gao-Rau Incident, Ma Hong was purged and demoted. He came to work in the National Economic Committee and was involved in the drafting of the "70 Industrial Regulations", which helped China recover from the Great Leap Forward. After co-composing the regulations Ma Hong wrote the "Management of Chinese Manufacturing Enterprises", which became the compass of industrial management at that time.

Later years
In 1978 Ma Hong's career rebounded and he founded the Industrial Economic Institute, becoming its director. He then became the president of the Chinese Academy of Social Sciences and Deputy General Secretary of the State Consul of the People's Republic of China. In 1984, at his suggestion, "the notion of a socialistic commercial economy was written into the CPC's list of doctrines." Ma Hong founded the State Council Development Research Centre, the first of its kind. Late in his career he warned the government of impending inflation, but the government chose to ignore his advice to its detriment.

Ma Hong has published more than 10 books in Chinese; New Strategy of Chinese Economic Development has been translated and edited by Fengbo Zhang and was published in Japan in 1985. His writings have been widely publicized, and in 2005 he won the Outstanding Economist Prize. On October 28, 2007, he died of Parkinson's disease.

References 

People.com (Chinese)
Fengbo Zhang: Cherishing the memory of Ma Hong

1920 births
2007 deaths
People's Republic of China economists
People of the Republic of China
People from Xinzhou
Economists from Shanxi
People's Republic of China writers
Writers from Shanxi